Mexico's has the 13th largest exclusive economic zone with a total surface area of , and places Mexico among the countries with the largest areas in the world.

Geography 

Mexico's EEZ is located in the Pacific Ocean, Gulf of California and Gulf of Mexico. It borders with Guatemala, Belize and Honduras to the south, Cuba to the east and the United States to the north.

See also 
Geography of Mexico
Borders of Mexico
Islands of Mexico

References

Mexico
Borders of Mexico
Economy of Mexico
Territorial disputes of Mexico
Mexico–United States relations